Urecho is a village in the Mexican state of Querétaro. It is located in the municipality of Colón. It has 1,666 inhabitants, and is located at 2,100 meters above sea level.

References

Populated places in Querétaro